Dash Pasak (also Romanized as Dāsh Pasak) is a village in Firuraq Rural District, in the Central District of Khoy County, West Azerbaijan Province, Iran. As shown by the 2006 census, its population was 50, divided into 14 families.

References 

Populated places in Khoy County